Grigori Akinfovich Belov (18 December 1895 – 13 September 1965) was a Russian actor. He appeared in more than ten films from 1940 to 1966.

Selected filmography

References

External links 

1895 births
1965 deaths
People from Vologda Oblast
People from Cherepovetsky Uyezd
Communist Party of the Soviet Union members
Soviet male film actors
Russian male film actors
Soviet male stage actors
Russian male stage actors
20th-century Russian male actors
Russian military personnel of World War I
People's Artists of the USSR
People's Artists of the RSFSR
Honored Artists of the RSFSR
Stalin Prize winners